Highway 721 is a highway in the Canadian province of Saskatchewan. It runs from Highway 379 near Rheinfeld to Highway 363 near Hallonquist.

Highway 721 also passes near the community of Braddock.

See also 
Roads in Saskatchewan
Transportation in Saskatchewan

References 

721